Cavadas is a surname. Notable people with the surname include:

Pedro Cavadas (surgeon) (born 1965), Spanish surgeon
Pedro Cavadas (footballer) (born 1992), Portuguese footballer

See also
Cavadas, locations
Cavada